Eucalyptus polita, also known as Parker Range mallet, is a species of mallet or small tree that is endemic to the southwest of Western Australia. It has smooth, greyish bark, narrow lance-shaped adult leaves, flower buds in groups of between seven and eleven, white flowers and cup-shaped fruit.

Description
Eucalyptus polita is a mallet or tree that typically grows to a height of  but does not form a lignotuber. It has smooth greyish bark that is shed in long ribbons to reveal orange-coloured new bark.

Taxonomy and naming
Eucalyptus polita was first formally described in 1993 by Ian Brooker and Stephen Hopper in the journal Nuytsia from material collected by Brooker on the Hyden - Norseman track in 1983. The specific epithet (polita) is from the Latin politus meaning "polished", referring to the bark.

Distribution and habitat
This mallet grows around salt lakes and on flat areas from Forrestania to near Marvel Loch in the Avon Wheatbelt, Coolgardie and Mallee biogeographic regions.

Conservation status
This mallee eucalypt is classified as "not threatened" by the Western Australian Government Department of Parks and Wildlife.

See also
 List of Eucalyptus species

References

Eucalypts of Western Australia
Trees of Australia
polita
Myrtales of Australia
Plants described in 1993
Taxa named by Ian Brooker
Taxa named by Stephen Hopper